Metzneria aspretella is a moth of the family Gelechiidae. It was described by Julius Lederer in 1869. It is found in Transcaspia, northern Iran and Palestine.

References

Moths described in 1869
Metzneria